The  is a mountain railway in Japan operated by the Hakone Tozan Railway. The company belongs to the Odakyu Group, which also owns the Hakone Tozan Cable Car.

The section of the line from Odawara Station to Hakone-Yumoto Station began operating in 1919, with the current terminus of Gōra being reached in 1930. Since 2006, only Odakyū Odawara Line trains run on the section from Odawara Station to Hakone-Yumoto Station, as that section was converted from dual-gauge (standard and narrow) to just narrow-gauge. From Gora, travelers can continue up the mountain on the Hakone Tozan Cable Car.

The railway is capable of climbing one meter vertically for every  of horizontal distance, with a maximum gradient of 8%. The line traverses Fuji-Hakone-Izu National Park, so the line was carefully designed to limit the impact on the scenery. Due to the difficult topography, the line has three switchbacks used to ascend particularly steep sections.

The section of the line between Hakone-Yumoto and Gora was suspended in October 2019 due to heavy damage caused by Typhoon Hagibis. On 9 July 2020, after repairs had been completed, test trains began running over the line with the expectation that full service would be restored later on 23 July.

Description 

 Length: 
 Gauge: 
 Odawara - Iriuda: 
 Iriuda - Hakone-Yumoto: / (dual gauge)
 Hakone-Yumoto - Gōra: 
 Stations: 11 (including termini)
 Track: single
 Power: 
 Odawara - Hakone-Yumoto: 1,500 V DC overhead supply
 Hakone-Yumoto - Gōra: 750 V DC overhead supply
 Block system: Automatic (cab signal/digital) (CTC)

Stations 
 Trains: "S" = All stop, "|" = All pass.

 Transfers:
 At Odawara Station:
  Odakyū Odawara Line
  Tōkaidō Line,  Shōnan-Shinjuku Line
  Tōkaidō Shinkansen
  Izu-Hakone Railway Daiyūzan Line
 At Gōra Station:
  Hakone Tozan Railway -  Hakone Tozan Cable Car
 Hakone-Yumoto Station is the terminus for all Hakone Tozan Line trains. 
 On the Odawara - Hakone-Yumoto section, Limited Express "Romancecar" and Local trains run through to and from the Odakyu Odawara Line. 
 Odakyu LE, Super Hakone, Hakone and Homeway services run from/to Shinjuku Station.
 Odakyu LE Metro Hakone runs between Hakone-Yumoto and Kita-Senju Station, on Tokyo Metro Chiyoda Line at weekends only. 
 Local trains runs between Odawara and Hakone-Yumoto, partly from/to Shin-Matsuda Station using 4-car Odakyu EMUs.
 Section between Hakone-Yumoto and Gōra is operated by local trains only, using Hakone Tozan 2/3-car EMUs.
 Trains stop at three signal stops which have no passenger platforms.
 There are three switchbacks: Deyama, Ōhiradai, and Kami-Ōhiradai.
 Journey time between Odawara - Hakone-Yumoto is approximately 15 minutes, Hakone-Yumoto - Gōra is approximately 40 minutes, Shinjuku - Hakone-Yumoto is approximately an hour and 25–35 minutes by limited express.

Signal stops
There are three signal stops on the Hakone Tozan Line in addition to the regular passenger stations. All of them have a siding track and two of them have switchbacks.

Deyama Switchback
Signal stop with a switchback. 234 m AMSL.

Kami-Ōhiradai Switchback
Signal stop with a switchback near Ōhiradai station which also has a switchback. 359 m AMSL.

Sennindai Signal Stop
Signal stop without a switchback. 410 m AMSL.

Rolling stock

Hakone Tozan Railway (Hakone-Yumoto - Gōra)
 MoHa 1
 MoHa 2
 1000 series ("Bernina", named after the Rhätische Bahn railway of the same name in Switzerland)
 2000 series ("St. Moritz", after the Swiss resort town and Bernina Railway terminus)
 3000 series (since November 2014)
 3100 series two-car EMU (since May 2017)
 MoNi 1 (non-revenue car)

All trains are based at Iriuda Depot.

Former
 MoHa 3 
 Yu 1 (as goods wagon)

Odakyu Electric Railway (Shinjuku - Odawara - Hakone-Yumoto)

Romancecar EMUs
 Odakyu 7000 series LSE
 Odakyu 10000 series HiSE
 Odakyu 20000 series RSE
 Odakyu 30000 series EXE
 Odakyu 50000 series VSE
 Odakyu 60000 series MSE (also from Kita-Senju)

Commuter EMUs
 Odakyu 1000 series
 Odakyu 5000 series
 Odakyu 8000 series

History 

 October 1, 1888: Odawara Horse-drawn Railway opens from Kōzu Station via Odawara Station, to Hakone-Yumoto Station.
 October 31, 1896: Operating company name is changed to Odawara Electric Railway.
 March 21, 1900: Line is electrified (as a tram, 600 V DC).
 June 1, 1919: Line opens between Hakone-Yumoto and Gōra as an electrified (600 V DC) funicular railway.
 December 16, 1920: Tram line closes between Kōzu - Odawara, and connected with the JGR (now JR) Tōkaidō Main Line at Odawara.
 August 16, 1928: Hakone Tozan Railway is founded.
 October 1, 1935: Mainline railway is extended from Hakone-Yumoto to Odawara. Tram line remains between Odawara - Hakone-Itabashi, and is renamed the "Odawara Town Line".
 December 20, 1940: Tram section is renamed "Odawara City Line".
 June 1, 1948: Hakone Tozan Railway becomes part of the Odakyu Group.
 August 1, 1950: Odakyu Electric Railway begins operating Limited Express and Express trains from Shinjuku to Hakone-Yumoto. The line voltage is changed to 1,500 V DC for the dual gauge section between Odawara and Hakone-Yumoto.
 June 1, 1956: Odawara City Line (tram) is abandoned.
 July 14, 1993: Hakone-Yumoto - Gōra section is uprated from 600 to 750 V DC. Operations start using 3-car EMUs.
 March 18, 2006: Hakone Tozan Railway discontinues operation using its own units between Odawara and Hakone-Yumoto. Dual-gauge section reduced to Iriuda - Hakone-Yumoto. 
 March 15, 2008: New Odakyu "Romancecar" through service starts from Kita-Senju Station.
 October 12, 2019: The section between Hakone-Yumoto and Gora closed due to severe damage caused by Typhoon Hagibis. The heavy rains caused landslides over the tracks and washed away ballast. In November 2019, the railway announced that repairs would keep the line closed until the fall of 2020.
On July 9th 2020, test trains began running on the fixed line with services scheduled to begin on July 23rd.

Microsoft Train Simulator
This route appears in Microsoft Train Simulator complete with scenarios simulating prototypical operation (Only from Odawara to Hakone-Yumoto).

References

External links

 Hakone Tozan Railway Official Site
 Hakone Navi (Odakyu official sightseeing guide, in English)

Lines of Hakone Tozan Railway
Hakone, Kanagawa
Railway lines opened in 1919
Standard gauge railways in Japan
750 V DC railway electrification
Railways with Zig Zags